Jan Ptáček of Pirkstein ( 1388 – 1419) was a Bohemian noble and lord of Rataje nad Sázavou and Polná.

Biography
Jan was born to Jan Ješek Ptáček of Pirkštein likely in 1388, given that some sources declare that he came of age in 1406. He inherited the name "Ptáček", or "Birdie", from his father.

Jan was a minor when his father died at the end of the 14th century. Consequently, Henry III of Lipá became his guardian. Hanuš of Lipá, the son of Henry, became Jan's guardian and administered the holdings after Henry's death. It was not until 1412 that Hanuš was ordered to leave and Jan began to rule his possessions.

Jan opposed the Hussites in the Hussite Wars. He is presumed to have died that same year, with his son Hynce Ptáček of Pirkstein succeeding him in 1420.

In popular culture
Hans Capon, a character in the 2018 video game Kingdom Come: Deliverance, is based on Jan.

Notes

References

1388 births
1419 deaths
Medieval Bohemian nobility
15th-century Bohemian people
People of the Hussite Wars